Karyn Gojnich (born 27 December 1960, née Davis) is an Australian sailor. She has competed for Australia at three Olympic Games, in 1988 in the Women's Two Person Dinghy (470), and in 2004 and 2008 in the three-person Yngling class.

Gojnich is a board member of Yachting Australia and in 2015 she was elected as a Vice-President of the Oceania Sailing Federation (OSAF).

References

External links
 Profile at the Australian Olympic Committee

Living people
1960 births
Sailors at the 1996 Summer Olympics – 470
Sailors at the 2004 Summer Olympics – Yngling
Sailors at the 2008 Summer Olympics – Yngling
Olympic sailors of Australia
Australian female sailors (sport)
People educated at Redlands, Cremorne
20th-century Australian women
21st-century Australian women